John Stewart, one of the characters known as Green Lantern, is a superhero appearing in American comic books published by DC Comics and was the second African-American superhero to appear in DC Comics. The character was created by Dennis O'Neil and Neal Adams, and first appeared in Green Lantern (Volume 2) #87 (December 1971/January 1972). Stewart's original design was based on actor Sidney Poitier.

The character is primarily voiced by Phil LaMarr in the DC Animated Universe (DCAU). David Ramsey portrays a character named John Diggle (né Stewart) / Spartan in the Arrowverse television series franchise, who is indicated to become a Green Lantern in the series finale of the former series. Wayne T. Carr was cast as John Stewart in the DC Extended Universe (DCEU) director's cut Zack Snyder's Justice League (2021), although his scenes were cut from the initial release of the film.

Publication history
John Stewart debuted in Green Lantern vol. 2 #87 (December 1971/January 1972) when artist Neal Adams came up with the idea of a substitute Green Lantern. The decision to make the character African American-descent resulted from a conversation between Adams and editor Julius Schwartz, in which Adams recounts saying that given the racial makeup of the world's population, "we ought to have a black Green Lantern, not because we’re liberals, but because it just makes sense." The character was DC's second superhero of African ancestry.

John Stewart has become a major recurring character in the Green Lantern mythos within the DC Universe. He became the primary character of Green Lantern vol. 2 from issues #182 through #200, when Hal Jordan relinquished his place in the Green Lantern Corps (1984–1986). He continued to star in the book when the title changed to The Green Lantern Corps from issue #201 to #224 (1986–1988). He would continue to make key appearances in Action Comics Weekly after The Green Lantern Corps cancellation (1988). He starred in the comic Green Lantern: Mosaic, which DC spun out of Green Lantern vol. 3, with a four-part storyline titled "Mosaic" (issues #14–17). DC published 18 issues of the ongoing Green Lantern: Mosaic title between June 1992 and November 1993.

John Stewart was featured as one of the lead characters on the television cartoon Justice League from 2001 until 2004. He continued to appear as a major character on the show's 2004–2006 sequel, Justice League Unlimited. In 2011, John Stewart starred in the New 52 relaunch of Green Lantern Corps alongside Guy Gardner, and became the sole lead character of the title from 2013 until the series' conclusion in 2015. Green Lantern Corps was replaced by Green Lantern: The Lost Army, which also stars John Stewart as the lead. In November 2022, it was announced, as a part of the Dawn Of DC relaunch, Stewart would star in a new miniseries entitled Green Lantern: John Stewart. The series will be written by Philp Kennedy Johnson and illustrated by Osvaldo Montos.  

Character biography
Early years
John Stewart is an architect, later "retconned" into a veteran U.S. Marine from Detroit, Michigan, who was selected by the Guardians as a backup Green Lantern to then-current Green Lantern Hal Jordan after the previous backup, Guy Gardner, was seriously injured after getting hit by a car while trying to save a civilian. Although Jordan objected to the decision after seeing that Stewart had a belligerent attitude to authority figures, the Guardians stood by their decision and chided Jordan for his supposed bigoted outlook on the issue. Jordan explained that he just felt that even though Stewart might have the integrity for the task, he "obviously would have a chip on his shoulder bigger than the rock of Gibraltar."

Jordan's opinion was that Stewart's first mission began badly. His assignment was to protect a racist politician, and Stewart, while averting an accident, took advantage of the situation to embarrass Jordan in the process. When an assassin shoots at the politician, Stewart does not intervene with Jordan in response to the attack, which initially makes Stewart seem suspect. However, it turns out Stewart had good reasons for this apparent dereliction of duty because he was stopping a gunman from killing a police officer in the outside parking lot at the event while Jordan was pursuing a decoy. When Jordan confronts Stewart about his actions, Stewart explains that the politician had staged the attack for political advantage. Jordan then concludes that Stewart was an excellent recruit and has proven his worth.

For some time, Stewart occasionally filled in as Green Lantern when Jordan was unavailable, including for some missions of the Justice League.

After Jordan gave up being Green Lantern in the 1980s, the Guardians selected Stewart for full-time duty. Stewart filled that role for some years. During that period he worked as an architect at Ferris Aircraft Company, battled many Green Lantern villains, and fought against the Anti-Monitor's forces during the Crisis on Infinite Earths. John was trained in usage of his power ring by Katma Tui, the Green Lantern of the planet Korugar. The duo went on many adventures together and eventually fell in love. Kat and John went on to serve within the Green Lantern Corps of Earth alongside Hal Jordan, Arisia, Kilowog, Salaak, and other alien Green Lanterns, during which time they were married.

After John's ring was rendered powerless through the schemes of Sinestro, and Katma Tui was murdered at the hands of the insane Star Sapphire, Stewart's life began to unravel. First, he was falsely accused of killing Carol Ferris, Star Sapphire's alter ego, and then falsely accused of theft by South Nambia (a fictional nation within the DC universe similar to apartheid-era South Africa). Jailed and tortured in South Nambia for weeks, John freed himself with his old ring, now re-powered thanks to the efforts of Hal Jordan. In his escape, John inadvertently frees both a serial killer and a terrorist. When Jordan confronts John over his actions, the two friends come to blows until John realizes the "revolutionaries" he had been aiding intended to murder innocent civilians.

Cosmic Odyssey

Afterwards, John left Earth for space, where he participated in the Cosmic Odyssey miniseries event, and failed to prevent the destruction of the planet Xanshi by an avatar of the Anti-Life Equation. The incident earned him the ire of J’onn J’onzz the Martian Manhunter, who was with him at the time. This series of tragedies left John a shattered man on the brink of suicide and created the villainess known as Fatality. J'onn J'onzz has since, at least civilly, forgiven him.

Green Lantern: Mosaic

John finally forgave himself for his past mistakes and grew into a stronger, more complex hero when he became the caretaker of the "Mosaic World", a patchwork of communities from multiple planets that had been brought to Oa by an insane Guardian who had invaded John's mind. Although bitter and sullen at his assignment at first, he overcame this and, using his formidable intellect and talent for unconventional thinking, Stewart forged the Mosaic into a new society and eventually became the first mortal Guardian of the Universe, known as the Master Builder. As his reward for this new level of awareness, John was reunited with his late wife, Katma Tui. However, tragedy struck once again and Hal Jordan, possessed by Parallax, destroyed both the Guardians and the Central Power Battery, robbing John of his newfound powers and his resurrected wife.

Darkstars and beyond

Following "Emerald Twilight" and the collapse of the Green Lantern Corps, Stewart was recruited by the Controllers to command the Darkstars, another interstellar peacekeeping force. Using the new resources at his command, Stewart evacuated the Mosaic cities from Oa prior to its destruction and served the Darkstars with distinction until he was crippled in battle with Grayven on the planet Rann. Stewart eventually regained the use of his legs as a parting gift from Jordan before Jordan sacrificed himself to destroy the Sun-Eater during the 1996 "The Final Night" storyline. As a result of Jordan healing him, he began to exhibit random bursts of energy from his hands that he was able to discharge on three different occasions. Though he had initially refused a new Green Lantern ring months prior, he eventually accepted a new one entrusted to Kyle Rayner by a time-lost Hal Jordan, and joined the Justice League to fill in for Rayner as he took an extended leave of absence from Earth.

Green Lantern: Rebirth

With the return of Hal Jordan and the Guardians, the Corps has been reorganized. Each sector of space now has two Green Lanterns assigned to it, and Stewart and Jordan now share regular duty for Earth's sector, 2814. After the dissolution of the Justice League in the aftermath of the 2004 miniseries Identity Crisis, and the destruction of their Watchtower headquarters on the moon, Stewart has begun playing a larger role in metahuman affairs, working with many former Justice Leaguers.

During the "52" storyline, John Stewart alongside Hal Jordan are involved in one of the first post-Freedom of Power Treaty confrontations. After a battle with the Great Ten and Black Adam, John and Hal are escorted to Russian airspace by the Rocket Red Brigade.

During the opening One Year Later storyline of Green Lantern, Hal Jordan tells Green Arrow that John Stewart is on an off-world undercover mission. The details John Stewart disguised himself as the bounty hunter "Hunger Dog" to undercover in Europe. When John hears that Hal Jordan is being held captive by Amon Sur and Loragg, he goes off to rescue him. This led to a confrontation with Amon Sur, who turns out to be the son of their predecessor, Abin Sur. During the fight, Amon receives a ring from the Sinestro Corps and vanishes.

In Justice League of America vol. 2, #7, he and Wonder Woman designed one of the League's new headquarters, The Hall. John later resumes his role as the League's resident Green Lantern upon Hal Jordan's request.

Sinestro Corps War

In the Green Lantern: Sinestro Corps Special, the Green Lantern Corps are attacked by Bedovian, the sniper of the Sinestro Corps, who is capable of taking out a target from three sectors away, all from the inside of a red Sun-Eater. After Bedovian takes out several Green Lanterns, John Stewart uses his power ring as a scoped sniper rifle to track the nearby sectors. He eventually discovers Bedovian's hiding spot and shoots him. As Green Lantern Corps member were forbidden from killing sentient beings at that time, Bedovian survived the attack, as recently seen in the Blackest Night crossover. John and Guy Gardner are captured by Lyssa Drak and taken back to Qward, where the two Lanterns are held captive.Green Lantern vol. 4, #22 (August 2007) Hal manages to defeat Lyssa and free John and Guy from their nightmares, while the Lost Lanterns recover Ion. The earth-based Lanterns then return home, only to find that New Earth, as the center of the Multiverse, is the Sinestro Corps' next target.

The Sinestro Corps and the Manhunters invade Earth. The Cyborg Superman and Superboy-Prime attack Superman, while Hal confronts Parallax, who has possessed Kyle Rayner, just before the latter is about to kill Hal's family. John orders Guy to retrieve a painting by Kyle Rayner's mother. When Parallax absorbs Hal inside himself, John looks on with sudden shock. Guy returns and shoves the painting into Parallax's eyesight, allowing Hal to use it to help Kyle overcome his fears and expel Parallax. Now in its original form, Parallax is then contained by Ganthet and Sayd within the Power Batteries of Hal, John, Guy, and Kyle. Ganthet and Sayd then reveal that they are no longer Guardians. Ganthet gives Kyle a new power ring and asks Kyle to become a Green Lantern again, to which he agrees. The four then race off to finish the fight. At Guy Gardner's suggestion, John and the other Lanterns use Warworld as a gigantic grenade, badly wounding the Anti-Monitor, who is then thrown into space by Superboy-Prime.

John Stewart witnessed Guy being infected by the Sinestro Corps member who is a living virus, named Despotellis, and asked Soranik Natu to help Guy. Soranik used the Green Lantern Corps smallpox virus named Leezle Pon, who stops Despotellis. John Stewart was later approached by the Guardians to become one of the Alpha Lanterns, a new division of the Corps devoted to the internal affairs of the Corps. Stewart, desiring more information about the secrecy of the Alpha Lantern program, declined the offer, to the extreme disappointment of the Guardians.

It has also been revealed that John served in the Marine Corps as a sniper prior to becoming an architect. While the idea of John being a Marine veteran was taken from the Justice League cartoon, the sniper angle is a new addition to the character's background. During his time in the Marines, John met the then young Hal Jordan when he was in the Air Force before they both join the Green Lantern Corps.

During the Rage of the Red Lanterns story arc, John Stewart is one of the guards assigned to escort Sinestro to Korugar to face execution. However, the Green Lanterns are ambushed by the Sinestro Corps and then the Red Lantern Corps under Atrocitus. The Green Lanterns are left to die in space after Atrocitus captures Sinestro, but they are saved by Saint Walker of the Blue Lantern Corps. John, however, is infected with the Red Lanterns' rage. Saint Walker conjures up a blue energy construct of Katma Tui, who heals John and calms him by showing him a vision of flying with Katma. John later tells Kilowog that he is going to see Katma again, saying that "the universe said so". In that same issue, Fatality is converted into a Star Sapphire, and orders her ring to locate John Stewart. When she tracks down John, she tells him she forgives him, and kisses him. Before departing, she encourages John to forgive himself for what happened to Xanshi.

Trinity

Stewart appears in the Trinity series. He is the one to first attack the alien creature Konvikt, but when he's on the verge of defeating him, his concentration suddenly snaps, and starts muttering incoherently in binary code. A moment later, he spontaneously generates complex weapons from his body, by means unrelated to his ring. Later, he attempts to overexert himself to know how he generated those weapons by running a brutal training session against holographic Qwardian Thunderers, which does not work. He later shows Firestorm the machinery used to monitor the Cosmic Egg imprisoning Krona, but as he leaves again, he suffers from a relapse and start generating knives from his uniform, and it is revealed the entire system is broken.

Later, on board the Antimatter Earth Crime Syndicate satellite, he again loses control and nearly brings down the satellite with his blasts. It is revealed these discharges are brought about due to John's absorption of a Qwardian superweapon, the Void Hound, which has been trying to escape its containment, or at least seize control of Stewart. After the sweeping, devastating effects of the spell engineered by Morgaine le Fey and Enigma, he is seen in an Earth under the control of a totalitarian Justice Society, where all Green Lanterns are forbidden to be. He eventually starts breaking down, and with the Void Hound gaining enough hold on him to force him to create a black hole which forces him back to Earth, he has no choice but to comply. The Void Hound is later revealed to be a servant of Krona, and its hold over John is broken when Krona is defeated.

Worlds Collide
After a massive battle between the JLA and the Shadow Cabinet, John chooses to stay with the League despite many of its members choosing to leave. After Kimiyo Hoshi goes missing while tracking down Shadow Thief, John blackmails the armored vigilante Hardware into helping the team track her down. The League arrives in the Himalayas, discovering Kimiyo and Superman's friend Icon engaged in a fierce battle with the cosmic vampire known as Starbreaker. The JLA defeats Starbreaker, and John takes a leave of absence to go to Xanshi.

Blackest Night

When John visits the grave of planet Xanshi, thousands of black rings fly into the planetary debris, and reconstitute the entire planet.Green Lantern vol. 4, #45 (August 2009) Xanshi itself then speaks to John, telling him "I can help you save them." Against his better judgment, John descends to the planet's surface. Once reaching the surface, John finds himself confronted by Katma Tui and the entire population of Xanshi as Black Lanterns. While battling them all, Katma tries to weaken John by claiming that he caused the planet's destruction. However, John, spurred on by Fatality's words, says that he wasn't the cause of it all and successfully fights off the Black Lanterns. After escaping Xanshi's atmosphere, John realises that the planet is headed for Earth, along with every Black Lantern in the universe, and contacts Hal, warning him of the impending threat. Later, John is saved by combined efforts of the various Lanterns corps, who had just arrived to battle the Black Lanterns.

Brightest Day

In the events of Brightest Day, John is seen on Oa, supervising the demolition of the buildings left in ruins after the Black Lanterns attack, and planning the reconstruction. Suddenly, he is called to the Guardians' chamber, where they order him to join Alpha Lantern Boodikka in a mission to robot planet Grenda, Stel's homeworld, where the communications ceased abruptly without explanation, and Lantern Stel and the population are missing. John agrees and departs with Boodikka.

After arriving on the planet, the two confirmed the Guardians report: the entire population has mysteriously disappeared. John asks Boodikka if something of her older self remains despite being turned into an Alpha Lantern, after she asks him why he refused to join the Alpha Lanterns. Boodikka responds that her changes are only physical, and she still has her former personality; John doubts this affirmation. The two discover what seems to be a Green Lantern House Sector, that, according to Boodikka, is not registered. After entering inside, they discovered Green Lanterns Horoq Nnot and Stel; the last one tells John he must flee from the planet immediately. Suddenly, Boodikka turns against John and attacks him; John fights back, but he's surrounded by more rogue Alpha Lanterns and is defeated. It's revealed that the Alpha Lanterns have begun a revolt against the rest of the Corps, and have allied themselves with the Cyborg Superman (now with an Alpha Lantern battery), taking control of Grenda to use the planet as their hidden base to turn Green Lanterns into Alpha Lanterns. John Stewart is last seen wounded and bleeding, being taken to Henshaw by Boodikka. Cyborg Superman then begins the cosmetic surgery to turn John into another Alpha Lantern.

Before starting the operation, however, Henshaw connects Stewart's brain to his memories to see why he was turned into a cyborg. He also reveals to John, that, after being resurrected by the Manhunters after the Sinestro Corps War, he returned to Earth in the middle of the Blackest Night, and pleaded to the Black Lanterns (among them are the former crew of his space shuttle) and Nekron to kill him, only to discover that because he did not have a physical heart, he was invisible to them. Angered for being ignored by death itself, the Cyborg Superman encountered the mysterious hooded stranger who abducted the entities of the Emotional Spectrum. He convinced him that Ganthet has the power and knowledge to turn Alpha Lanterns into normal beings again. John realizes that Henshaw organized the revolt of the Alpha Lanterns with the sole purpose to attract Ganthet to the planet Grenda and forced him to turn Henshaw into a mortal being again. Kyle and Soranik burst into the lab and manage to rescue John, but Ganthet is captured. They hide in a cave, where John informs them about the Cyborg Superman's true plan. They also discover the missing robot inhabitants of the planet, trapped in the depths of the cave by Henshaw. Mounting a defense, they battle against Henshaw and his forces, destroying the cyborg's body. Henshaw leaps into Boodikka's body, but her consciousness manages to defeat his, seemingly destroying him. John later joins Kyle Rayner and Ganthet in a mission to the anti-matter universe to save Soranik Natu.

War of the Green Lanterns

On their return to the matter universe, John and the others are affected by the return of Parallax to the Central Power Battery by Krona. Their previous experience with Parallax allows John, Kyle and Ganthet to escape its control, but they are forced to fight their fellow Green Lanterns. Affected by Parallax's fear powers, John and Kyle are forced to remove their rings and escape through Oa's underground. They then meet up with Guy and Hal, who has the rings of the other corps' leaders. John initially chooses Larfleeze's orange ring, but is convinced by Hal to use Indigo-1's ring instead due to the debilitating effects of the orange ring on the wearer's psyche. When the corrupted Green Lanterns attack, John has difficulty channeling the various corps powers through his ring. Things are made worse when Mogo joins the attack. While Hal and Guy go to remove Parallax from the Central Power Battery, John and Kyle attempt to free Mogo from Krona's control. On the way, John attempts to stop the flow of tainted rings sent by Mogo, but fails. As he and Kyle head for Mogo's core instead, they discover residual Black Lantern energy around it. John absorbs the Black Lantern energy, along with all the Green Lantern energy, and regretfully uses it to destroy Mogo, knowing that they lack the time to heal Mogo before Krona uses it to 'recruit' a wave of reinforcement Green Lanterns. In the fallout, the two regroup with Hal, Guy and Ganthet, using the full power of the emotional spectrum to crack open the Battery and release Parallax. Their job done, the Lanterns regain their original green rings, in preparation for the final confrontation with Krona.

Following the War's conclusion, John assists a new Green Lantern from Sector 282 'selected' during the period when Mogo was under Krona's control in adjusting to the power of her ring despite the possibility that she will not be allowed to keep it by assisting her in halting a war taking place in her sector, the original Lantern for that sector having died during the war. When John is able to help the two sides find a peaceful resolution to their conflict, his new student reflects that, despite John's reputation after destroying two worlds, she now knows that nobody could regret that action more than John himself.

The New 52
After Hal's expulsion and Kyle's departure in The New 52, John joins Guy Gardner and others in investigating recent attacks in a distant sector of space, which are revealed to be the result of an old Guardian experiment. At one point, John is forced to kill Kirrt Kallak, another Lantern who was about to give in to torture and reveal the access codes to the Oan defence network. John is approached by the Alpha Lantern to arrest him for that murder. He is found guilty for this crime and sentenced to death. However Guy Gardner and other fellow Lanterns free him before the execution, resulting in the destruction of the Alpha Lanterns when the Green Lanterns refuse to allow John to be executed. During the fights, the Alpha Lanterns (revealing to the reader that the Guardians set up these events as part of their plans to destroy the Corps) realize that all the Alpha Lanterns had become dangerously mentally unstable. Alpha Lantern Varix caused a reaction which killed all the Alpha Lanterns, including himself.

During the "Rise of the Third Army" storyline, the Guardians contact John and state that Mogo's remains appear to be moving, The Guardians have come to the conclusion that Mogo is trying to reform and assign John to track it. While tracking the Mogo fragment's destination, he is discovered by Fatality, who is seeking a sundered love in danger. After they find Mogo's pieces – realizing that the endangered love is the male and female elements of Mogo's personality trying to come back together- John figures out that the Guardians want to use Mogo. After the villainous First Lantern is destroyed and the unemotional Guardians are killed off by Sinestro, John begins a relationship with Fatality in-between on Mogo.

After the invasion of Durlans, John discovered that a Durlan impersonated Fatality delectably throughout the months. John defeats the imposter and vows to search for the real Fatality. When John locates and reunites with her on the Durlan prison planet, Fatality attacks him. She revealed to him that the Zamarons had influenced her into becoming a Star Sapphire, forcing her to love him when she actually hated him. After John refuses to fight, Fatality leaves, telling John that he and the Star Sapphires are her enemies leaving John in sorrow.

DC Rebirth
Following the events of "Lost Army" and "Edge of Oblivion" leading to DC Rebirth, John and the rest of the Green Lantern Corps return to their universe and are about to attack Warworld when it is destroyed by Hal Jordan. After meeting up with a previously captured Guy Gardner and newly turned Sinestro Corp leader Soranik Natu and saving the Xudarian homeworld from a joint invasion from Brainiac and Larfleeze, the remains of both corps join forces.

Powers and abilities

As a Green Lantern, John Stewart is semi-invulnerable, capable of projecting hard-light constructions, flight, and utilizing various other abilities through his power ring which are only limited by his imagination and willpower. John's unique combination of military and architecture expertise makes him one of the Corps most exceptional members.

Unlike other Green Lanterns, John doesn't wear a physical Green Lantern ring. Following an attack by The Legion of Doom, and a confrontation with Sinestro, John has a Green Lantern symbol branded on his finger which allows his body to act as his power ring, with his heart functioning as his power battery. John's physical power ring was destroyed when Sinestro infused him with the Ultraviolet Light of the Invisible Spectrum down to the cellular level. John was able to overcome Umbrax's influence and turned his UV Lantern Corp tattoo ring into a Green Lantern tattoo ring. The full nature and extent of his capabilities are unknown.

John Stewart's power ring physiology provides him with the abilities of all other Green Lanterns; flight, semi-invulnerability, energy projection, hard light construct creations, etc.
The ring is a weapon of the mind and powered by willpower, therefore it's only limited to the wearer's imagination.
Stewart was briefly taught by Ganthet how to reroute his mind to think in the 'language of the spheres', the first language of the universe, to evade telepathic detection by Fernus, the 'Burning Martian' identity of the Martian Manhunter; although the intensity of this method meant that John couldn't use it for more than a minute without burning his mind out, it has never been specified if this means that he cannot use it again after he tapped it to rescue the rest of the League from Fernus, or if he could use it at some future date if enough time has elapsed since his last use of it.
Like all Green Lanterns, Stewart's personality affects his ring's creations, giving them a solid, architectural quality. In Green Lantern: Rebirth, Hal Jordan remarks that "everything John builds is solid". He also remarked that Stewart is the best flyer in the Corps.
In Green Lantern (vol. 4) #26, it was shown that John's willpower can exceed the limits of the Green Lantern power ring, when he tried to recreate the Xanshi solar system; a feat that had not been depicted before this point.
John served as a Sergeant in the United States Marine Corps and was an expert sniper.
When he temporarily used Indigo-1's ring as a member of the Indigo Tribe, John was capable of accessing the powers of all Lantern Corps rings in his vicinity, even managing to harness the power of the Black Lantern Corps by drawing on the residual Black Lantern energy around Mogo's core. John is not shown to be significantly affected by the Indigo Ring's mind-altering capabilities, although this could be because he was already capable of feeling compassion.
Due to his background in architecture, John's mastery of constructs is unique in comparison to other Lanterns. John is precise and meticulous when using his ring, often building his constructs from the inside out. Every construct is foundationally sound, never hollow, forming every detail, every nut and bolt required for whatever he builds.
In Justice League Vol. 4 #15, John demonstrates just how abstract and precise he can be with his ring, creating kryptonite down to the isotopic level. In that same issue, John was able to reach into the body of a Dominantor and block oxygen from reaching their brain, knocking them out.

As well as his obvious powers as a Lantern, John has also demonstrated a willingness to kill when he is certain the situation requires it, destroying Mogo to save the universe from the army of Krona-controlled Green Lanterns that Mogo would have created and later killing a fellow Lantern who was about to give in to torture and reveal vital information to their enemies.

Other versions
Superman: Red Son
John Stewart is a member of the Green Lantern Marine Corps in Superman: Red Son.

Justice
John appeared as a reserve Green Lantern in Justice. The Legion of Doom kidnapped all friends and relatives of the members of the League and mind-controlled the youngest generation of heroes to watch over them. John hadn't got a power ring at his disposal and was captured together with everyone else. 
Eventually Green Arrow and Black Canary found the place where the Legion's hostages were locked and handed Hal's Power Ring to John. John quickly used the Ring to destroy the mindworms controlling Supergirl, Batgirl, Robin and other young heroes and wipe the knowledge of the League's identities from their enemies' minds. Afterwards he sent the Ring back to Hal when his friend was fighting Sinestro.

Anti-Matter Universe
John, known now as Power Ring, is shown to be a member of the anti-matter universe Crime Syndicate that attempts to kidnap Power Girl in JSA: Classified.

Flashpoint
In the Flashpoint universe, John Stewart was a member of Team 7, an elite unit of soldiers led by Grifter. John and most of his teammates were ultimately killed during a botched attack on a terrorist training camp.

Book of Oa
In the distant future, the Book of Oa shows that John will one day become a United States Senator and marry Fatality.

In other media

Television
 John Stewart appears in series set in the DC Animated Universe (DCAU), voiced by Phil LaMarr.
 First appearing in Justice League, this version is a former United States Marine and founding member of the eponymous team whose eyes glow green as a side effect of prolonged exposure to his power ring's energy. Additionally, he is able to affect yellow objects. Throughout the series, he forms a relationship with teammate Hawkgirl, though a rift develops between them following the three-part series finale "Starcrossed".
 Additionally, an alternate universe incarnation of Stewart who became a member of the Justice Lords appears in the two-part episode "A Better World".
 Stewart makes guest appearances in Static Shock. In the two-part episode "A League of Their Own", he and the League join forces with Static and Gear to defeat Brainiac after he takes over the Watchtower. In the episode "Fallen Hero", Stewart seeks out Static's help after Sinestro steals his power battery and frames him for several crimes.
 Stewart appears in Justice League Unlimited. As of this series, he has begun dating Vixen, but retains feelings for Hawkgirl, is shown to be a close friend of fellow former marine Rex Mason, and displays a soldier's attitude in his personal life. Additionally, he encounters his and Hawkgirl's future son Rex Stewart / Warhawk while traveling through time to stop Chronos.
 John Stewart makes a non-speaking cameo appearance in the Duck Dodgers episode "The Green Loontern".
 John Stewart appears in Young Justice, voiced by Kevin Michael Richardson. This version is a member of the Justice League and Black Lightning's ex-brother-in-law.
 According to co-developer Giancarlo Volpe, John Stewart was meant to appear in Green Lantern: The Animated Series before the series was cancelled.
 John Stewart makes non-speaking cameo appearances in Teen Titans Go!.
 Elements of John Stewart are incorporated into the Arrowverse character John Diggle'''. Most notably, he has an estranged stepfather whose surname is Stewart and, as such, refuses to use this himself.
 John Stewart makes non-speaking appearances in Harley Quinn as a member of the Justice League.
 John Stewart will appear in the upcoming series Lanterns.

Film
 John Stewart was meant to appear in Justice League: Mortal, with the role being originally offered to Columbus Short before Common was ultimately cast in the role. The film was going to be developed by Warner Bros. Pictures from a script by Michele and Kieran Mulroney and directed by George Miller. However, the film was pushed back due to the Writers Guild of America strike and the Australian Film Commission refusing to house filming over tax incentive disagreements. After nearly two years into production, the film was canceled.
 John Stewart appears in the DC Animated Movie Universe (DCAMU) film Justice League Dark, voiced by Roger R. Cross. This version is a member of the Justice League.
 John Stewart was intended to appear in the DC Extended Universe (DCEU) film Green Lantern Corps, portrayed by Wayne T. Carr.
 John Stewart appears in Teen Titans Go! To the Movies, voiced by Lil Yachty.
 The Red Son incarnation of John Stewart appears in Superman: Red Son, voiced again by Phil LaMarr.
 John Stewart appears in the DCAMU film Justice League Dark: Apokolips War, voiced again by Roger R. Cross. He attempts to defend the Green Lantern Corps from Darkseid, but is killed by him.
 John Stewart was intended to appear in the DCEU film Zack Snyder's Justice League, portrayed again by Wayne T. Carr, but Warner Bros. Pictures and DC Films denied the eponymous Zack Snyder access as it would have conflicted with their plans for Stewart.
 John Stewart makes a cameo appearance in Space Jam: A New Legacy, portrayed by an uncredited actor.
 John Stewart appears in Teen Titans Go! & DC Super Hero Girls: Mayhem in the Multiverse, voiced again by Phil LaMarr.
 John Stewart appears in Green Lantern: Beware My Power, voiced by Aldis Hodge.

Video games
 John Stewart appears as a playable character in Justice League Heroes, voiced by Michael Jai White.
 John Stewart appears in Justice League: Injustice for All and Justice League: Chronicles.
 John Stewart appears as a playable and non-player character (NPC) in DC Universe Online, voiced by Ken Thomas and George Washington III respectively.  
 John Stewart appears as a downloadable alternate skin for Hal Jordan in Injustice: Gods Among Us, voiced again by Phil LaMarr.
 John Stewart appears as a NPC in Young Justice: Legacy, voiced again by Kevin Michael Richardson.
 John Stewart appears as a playable character in Lego Batman 3: Beyond Gotham, voiced by Ike Amadi.
 John Stewart appears as a playable character in Lego DC Super-Villains, voiced by Nyambi Nyambi.
 John Stewart appears as a "premier skin" for Hal Jordan in Injustice 2, voiced again by Phil LaMarr.
 John Stewart appears as a playable character in Teen Titans Go! Figure.
 John Stewart will appear in Suicide Squad: Kill the Justice League as a member of the Justice League.

Merchandise
John Stewart was considered to receive an action figure in the proposed fourth wave of Kenner Products' "Super Powers Collection". Despite this, he has received figures in other toy lines.

Miscellaneous
 John Stewart, wearing his Green Lantern: Mosaic suit, appears in a Saturday Night Live sketch inspired by The Death of Superman, portrayed by Tim Meadows
 John Stewart appears in Smallville: Lantern as a detective for the New York Police Department and Clark Kent's mentor.
 The DCAU incarnation of John Stewart appears in a flashback in the tie-in comic Justice League Beyond. Sometime after the events of Justice League Unlimited, Vixen was murdered by the Shadow Thief on the night Stewart planned to propose to her. While working with Hawkgirl and Adam Strange to avenge Vixen, Stewart kills Shadow Thief, resigns from the Green Lantern Corps, with his ring being passed onto Kai-Ro decades later, and retires from the Justice League. Following these events, he would eventually marry Hawkgirl and give birth to Rex Stewart.
 John Stewart appears in the Injustice: Gods Among Us'' prequel comic. Upon learning from the Guardians of the Universe of Superman's growing tyranny and Hal Jordan going rogue, Stewart joins his fellow Corpsmen in apprehending the latter before secretly allowing him to escape, believing Superman has good intentions. Stewart joins Jordan in returning to Earth and joining Superman's Regime in enforcing global peace. Seven months later, Guy Gardner attempts to reason with Superman, but the latter breaks his arm. Seeing Superman for the tyrant he has become, Stewart tries to intervene, only to be killed by Sinestro.

Reception
IGN ranked John Stewart as the 55th greatest comic book hero of all time describing him as one of the first dominant African-American heroes in the pages of DC Comics; IGN also stated that John Stewart has gone from "semi-obscurity in the mainstream to absolute recognition" thanks to his starring role in the acclaimed Justice League cartoons.

References

External links

 Green Lantern John Stewart Website
 World of Black Heroes: Green Lantern John Stewart Biography

 Alan Kistler’s profile on Green Lantern
 John Stewart at The Book of OA
 The Rise of the Black Green Lantern

Characters created by Dennis O'Neil
Characters created by Neal Adams
Comics characters introduced in 1971
African-American superheroes
Black characters in animation
Black people in comics
Fictional architects
Fictional characters from Detroit
Fictional United States Marine Corps personnel
DC Comics male superheroes
DC Comics military personnel
DC Comics characters who can teleport 
Green Lantern Corps officers